Streptomyces geranii is a bacterium species from the genus of Streptomyces which has been isolated from the root of a Geranium carolinianum plant from the Mount Emei in China.

See also 
 List of Streptomyces species

References 

geranii
Bacteria described in 2018